Úterý is a town in Plzeň-North District in the Plzeň Region of the Czech Republic. It has about 500 inhabitants. The town centre is well preserved and is protected by law as an urban monument zone.

Administrative parts
Villages of Olešovice and Vidžín are administrative parts of Úterý.

Etymology
The name of the town literally means "Tuesday".

Geography
It lies in the Teplá Highlands.

The Úterský Stream flows through the town.

History
The town was probably founded in 11th century, however the first written mention is from 1233.

Economy
Almost half of houses in Úterý are recreational objects.

Sights
The landmark of the town is the Church of the Nativity of Saint John the Baptist. It is a Baroque building from 1695–1698, created by the project of Kilian Ignaz Dientzenhofer.

References

External links

Cities and towns in the Czech Republic
Populated places in Plzeň-North District